Prospero Ricca (1838–1895) was an Italian painter, mainly of snowy landscapes. He was also a lawyer.

He was born and resided in Saluzzo in the Piedmont. He studied at the Accademia Albertina of Fine Arts in Turin. In 1872 at Milan he exhibited: Palude; in 1877 at Naples, Dintorni of Turin and Paesaggio; in 1880 at Turin, Il lago d'Arignano ed i suoi castellani a caccia; at the 1881 Mostra of Venice, he displayed Nevicata: in 1883 at Rome, Grappoli d'uva; and the next year in Saluzzo La vedovella (Nevicata) and Presso Alpignano. Other paintings of this artist are: Povero parroco (Nevicata); Inverno; exhibited in 1887 at Venice, Nevicata; exhibited in 1888 at Bologna,  Convento in Liguria. His younger brother, Pietro Ricca was also a landscape painter.

References

1838 births
1895 deaths
People from Saluzzo
19th-century Italian painters
Italian male painters
Italian landscape painters
Painters from Piedmont
Accademia Albertina alumni
19th-century Italian male artists